Pervari is a town and seat of the Pervari District of Siirt Province in Turkey. It is populated by Kurds of the Adiyan and Şakiran tribes and had a population of 6,261 in 2021.

The town is divided into the two neighborhoods of Aydın and Şakiran.

References

Populated places in Siirt Province
Kurdish settlements in Siirt Province